The Plaza Mayor de Lima, or Plaza de Armas de Lima, is considered one of the birthplaces of the city of Lima, as well as the core of the city. Located in the Historic Centre of Lima, it is surrounded by the Government Palace, Lima Metropolitan Cathedral, Archbishop's Palace of Lima, the Municipal Palace, and the Palacio de la Unión.

Overview
The Plaza de Armas is surrounded by the Jirón Junín, Jirón de la Unión, Jirón Huallaga, and the Jirón Carabaja streets.

In 1523, King Charles I of Spain mandated the Procedures for the creation of cities in the New World. These procedures indicated that after outlining a city's plan, growth should follow a grid centered on the square shape of the plaza.

On the day of the foundation of the city, January 18, 1535, the conquistador Francisco Pizarro, conforming to established procedure, designated a location to build the plaza. Later, Pizarro and Nicolás de Rivera, the city's first mayor, toured the city's location and split parcels. Pizarro, taking advantage of his title of founder and governor, took a large parcel of land between the north side of the plaza and the Rímac River. The lot to the south of the plaza was designated to be a church, the western lot was to be the site of a city council, and the rest of the lots were divided among the rest of the conquistadors.

The 17th-century historian Bernabé Cobo said of the plaza:

It is the finest and most well-formed [plaza] that I have ever seen, even in Spain. It occupies an entire block, with the width of four streets on one side and four streets on the other, and with all four sides it measures more than two thousand feet; it is very ample.

Subsequently, the viceroy Diego López de Zúñiga y Velasco, count of Nieva, proposed the gallows, which had previously been located at the centre of the plaza, be moved nearer to the river to the location which is now the Desamparados train station. In place of it, a new water fountain was built at the centre of the plaza. The gallows were returned to the south side of the plaza on the Callejón de Petateros.

The first water fountain built on the plaza was constructed by the viceroy Francisco de Toledo, and was inaugurated on October 21, 1578. It consisted of a baluster and an elevated bowl, and in it had eight pipes through which water fell into the bowl on the next level. A ball at the top of the fountain dispersed water back onto the lower levels. The seal of the city was inscribed on this ball.

The water fountain was replaced in by the viceroy García Sarmiento de Sotomayor, Count of Salvatierra, who inaugurated it on September 8, 1651. This fountain remains as the centerpiece of the plaza to this day.

During the colonial era, the plaza served as a market, bull fighting ring, and the city gallows. The plaza also became home to the auto-da-fé in which the Inquisition occurred. The tribunal of the Inquisition had one of its three courts located in Lima. The first conviction occurred on November 15, 1573, and this was the first heretic to be tried and executed in the New World.

In 1622, the Cathedral of Lima is completed. This church still stands today on the plaza.

In the early nineteenth century, chef Juan José Cabezudo had a food stall in the Escribanos portal, a place very close to the plaza, where he served typical Peruvian dishes, including tamales.

In 1821, José de San Martín proclaimed the Independence of Peru on this plaza. After this historic event, the flag of the new republic was paraded around the plaza.

In 1855, President Ramón Castilla inaugurated the first public gas lighting system which were first installed on the light posts of the plaza. Also at this time, gardens were planted on the plaza as up until this time it was made of pavement. In 1860, the first rail ways for trams were installed on the plaza.

In 1922, construction of the Archbishop's Palace of Lima was completed. In 1938, the Government Palace was completed and in 1944 the Municipal Palace was completed.

Surroundings

360° view of Plaza Mayor, Lima

See also

 Historic centre of Lima
 Lima
 Plaza de Armas
 Viceroyalty of Peru

References

Bibliography
 Cobo, Bernabé. "Historia de la Fundación de Lima"
 Bromley, Juan. "Las viejas calles de Lima" Lima: Municipalidad Metropolitana de Lima. Gerencia de Educación, Cultura y Deportes. Edilibros; 2005.
 Joffre, Gabriel Ramón. "El guión de la cirugía urbana: Lima 1850-1940"

Mayor
Spanish Colonial architecture in Peru
Parks in Peru